Lyudmila Vasilyevna Zaytseva (born 21 July 1946) is a Soviet and Russian film actress, People's Artist of the RSFSR (1989) and laureate of the State Prize of the USSR (1983). Her movie career began in 1967.

During the Russian presidential election of 1996, she was a confidant of Gennady Zyuganov and supported his election campaign by travelling with concert brigades throughout the country.

For more than 30 years, she was married to Gennady Voronin, a screenwriter and film director, who died in 2011. Lyudmila Zaytseva has a daughter from this marriage actress Vasilisa Voronina.

Selected filmography 
 The Story of Asya Klyachina (1967)
 The Dawns Here Are Quiet (1972)
 Moscow, My Love (1974)
 Twenty Days Without War (1976)
 The Train Has Stopped (1982)
 Lev Tolstoy (1984)
 Little Vera (1988)
 Fast Train (1988)
 Sons of Bitches (1990)
 Boys (1990)
 Secrets of Palace Revolutions (2000-2008)

References

External links
   

1946 births
Living people
People from Ust-Labinsky District
Soviet film actresses
Soviet television actresses
Soviet stage actresses
Russian film actresses
Russian television actresses
20th-century Russian actresses
21st-century Russian actresses
People's Artists of the RSFSR
Recipients of the USSR State Prize